Annbjørg Lien (born 15 October 1971) is a Norwegian musician, playing the hardingfele (Hardanger fiddle), violin, and nyckelharpa.

Career 
She first came to national prominence in 1986. Shortly afterwards got a recording deal with the Heilo label and released her first album on that label in 1988. She has received numerous awards, both in Norway and the Nordic countries, including the Gammleng Prize in classical folk music in 2004 and the Hilmar Prize in 2006.

In her work, Lien often combines traditional Norwegian music with jazz and rock music. She has traveled to Africa, Asia, Australia, Argentina, Bhutan, Greenland, Iceland, Sri Lanka, North America, and other parts of Europe, and worked with musicians from many countries. In 2006 she performed on Loreena McKennitt's album An Ancient Muse playing nyckelharpa, and in 2008 she played Hardanger fiddle on Mairéad Ní Mhaonaigh's album Imeall.

Her 2008 project Waltz With Me brought together American fiddler, guitarist and singer Bruce Molsky, Swedish violist Mikael Marin and Canadian cellist Christine Hanson for a concert commissioned by the Telemark Festival. The project included a CD of the same name. With Arve Moen Bergset, Bjørn Ole Rasch and Steinar Ofsdal, she is a member of the folk music group Bukkene Bruse.

Lien is part of the fiddle ensemble String Sisters, which formed in 2000 and consists of six string players from different countries, who released their début album Live in 2007.

Personal life and education
She is married to keyboardist and professor Bjørn Ole Rasch.

In 2019 she received her PhD degree in hardingfele (Hardanger fiddle games) from the University of Agder. She has no other academic education and learned fiddle games straight from the masters.

Honours 
Spellemannprisen 1993 in the class Traditional for the album Bukkene Bruse, within Bukkene Bruse
Gammleng-prisen 2004 in the class Traditional folk music
Hilmar Prize 2006

Discography

Solo albums 
1983: Eg Er Liten Eg, Men Eg Vågar Meg (Grappa Music)
1988: Kjellstadslåttar (Grappa Music)
1989: Annbjørg (Kirkelig Kulturverksted)
1994: Felefeber (Grappa Music)
1996: Prisme (Grappa Music)
1999: Baba Yaga (Grappa Music)
2002: Aliens Alive (Grappa Music)
2005  Emma (Agder Theatre Music) with Bjørn Ole Rasch
2008: Waltz With Me (Grappa Music)
2009: Come Home (Grappa Music), with Bjørn Ole Rasch
2010: Alle Vegne (Kirkelig Kulturverksted), with Sondre Bratland
2012: Khoom Loy (Grappa Music)
2015: Drifting Like A Bird (Heilo Music)

Collaborative works 
Within Bukkene Bruse
1993: Bukkene Bruse
1995: Åre (Grappa Music)
1998: Steinstolen (Grappa Music)
2001: Den Fagraste Rosa
2004: Spel

With others
1987: I Seierstakt (Celebration)
2007: String Sisters Live (Grappa Music)
2010: Abocurragh, with Andy Irvine
2011: Beginner's Guide to Scandinavia (3-CD box set), with various artists
2012 Nordic Woman with various artists released by Fuuse Mousiqi/Grappa Music

References

External links

Annbjørg Lien Biography Store Norske Leksikon - Kunnskapsforlaget (in Norwegian)
Annbjørg Lien - Tjønneblomen on YouTube
Annbjørg Lien "Khoom Loy" on YouTube

1971 births
Living people
Musicians from Ålesund
Norwegian fiddlers
Norwegian traditional musicians
Nyckelharpa players
Grappa Music artists
Heilo Music artists
String Sisters members
21st-century Norwegian singers
21st-century Norwegian women singers
21st-century violinists